Alexandra Szacka is a Canadian television journalist, who has been a foreign correspondent for CBC News in both the English and French divisions. She has been the network's correspondent in New York City, Moscow and Paris.

Szacka's career began at Radio-Québec and has earned her numerous awards, including the Prix Judith-Jasmin and a Prix Gémeaux. She earned a master's degree in anthropology from Université Laval and is fluent in five languages: English, French, Spanish, Polish and Russian.

Born in Poland, she is the sister of writer Joanna Gruda and journalist Agnès Gruda.

References

Canadian television reporters and correspondents
Polish emigrants to Canada
Université Laval alumni
Year of birth missing (living people)
Living people
Canadian women television journalists